KooKoo is the debut solo album by American singer Debbie Harry, released on July 27, 1981, by Chrysalis Records. Produced by Nile Rodgers and Bernard Edwards of Chic, the album was recorded whilst Harry took a break from her band Blondie. It was a moderate commercial success, reaching number 25 on the US Billboard 200 and number six on the UK Albums Chart.

Background
KooKoo was recorded while Harry and boyfriend Chris Stein were taking a break from the band Blondie. The album was produced by Nile Rodgers and Bernard Edwards of the R&B band Chic, who had just had major success working with Diana Ross on her 1980 album Diana. Harry and Stein first met the pair at the Power Station recording studio in New York while Blondie were recording their 1979 album Eat to the Beat, and they remained good friends in the intervening years. KooKoo was one of three albums to be (co)written and produced by Rodgers and Edwards in 1981, the other two being Chic's fifth album Take It Off and Johnny Mathis' I Love My Lady, which remained unreleased until 2017.

KooKoo showcased the early fusion of funk, rock and dance music that would become the trademark of Rodgers and Edwards, and this style would later be evident on albums such as David Bowie's Let's Dance, Duran Duran's Notorious, The Power Station's self-titled debut album, and Robert Palmer's Riptide. Backing vocals were provided by Mark Mothersbaugh and Gerald Casale of Devo, credited as Spud and Pud Devo.

KooKoo reached number six on the UK Albums Chart and spent seven weeks on the chart, being certified silver by the British Phonographic Industry (BPI) for shipments in excess of 60,000 copies. The album reached number 25 on the US Billboard 200 and was certified gold by the Recording Industry Association of America (RIAA), denoting shipments in excess of 500,000 copies.

Originally only available on vinyl album and cassette, KooKoo was digitally remastered and re-issued on compact disc with two bonus tracks (the 12″ versions of "Backfired" and "The Jam Was Moving") by EMI in the United Kingdom in 1994, and by Razor & Tie in the United States in 1999, this time with just one bonus track. The album was reissued again in the US by Gold Legion.com in 2011 (the 30th anniversary of the album's release). This reissue includes three bonus tracks (both of the aforementioned 12″ versions, and also the rare extended mix of "Inner City Spillover") as well as extensive liner notes.

Promotion
The cover art for the album was created by Swiss artist H.R. Giger, known for his design work on the 1979 sci-fi/horror film Alien. Based on a photograph of Harry taken by the renowned photographer Brian Aris, Giger created several variations of the cover (another of which is seen on the album's inner sleeve) in what Harry described as a combination of punk, acupuncture and sci-fi. Harry stated that the album title came to her after she saw Giger's completed work, and although she had misgivings about the conceptual ideas behind the artwork (as she did not identify either the album or herself as "punk"), she was suitably impressed to use it anyway.

For the promotion of KooKoo, Chrysalis Records planned to display large posters of the album cover in various stations of the London Underground. However, officials deemed the image of Harry with metal skewers going through her face and neck to be too disturbing. A television ad campaign went ahead, however.

Promo videos were made for the tracks "Backfired" and "Now I Know You Know", both directed by Giger and filmed at his studio in Switzerland. "Backfired" featured a dark-haired Harry dancing superimposed over a backdrop of Giger's distinctive artwork, with Giger himself appearing in a semi-translucent face mask. "Now I Know You Know" featured Harry in a long black wig and a form-fitting bodysuit painted with Giger's unusual artwork, dancing around in a small set furnished with Giger's "bio-mechanical" design work.

Singles
Two singles were released from the album: "Backfired", which peaked at number 24 in Australia, number 32 in the UK and number 43 in the US in August 1981, and "The Jam Was Moving", which reached number 82 in the US.

A third single, "Chrome", was only released in some parts of Europe, but failed to chart. Another track, "Jump Jump", was only released as a single in Peru.

"Chrome" served as the B-side to "The Jam was Moving", only being issued in Germany as a single and in the US as a promotional 12-inch single only.

Track listing
Side A:
 "Jump Jump" (Deborah Harry, Chris Stein) – 4:04
 "The Jam Was Moving" (Bernard Edwards, Nile Rodgers) – 2:59  
 "Chrome" (Deborah Harry, Chris Stein) – 4:17  
 "Surrender" (Bernard Edwards, Nile Rodgers) – 3:37
 "Inner City Spillover" (Deborah Harry, Chris Stein) – 5:04
Side B: 
 "Backfired" (Bernard Edwards, Nile Rodgers) – 4:54 
 "Now I Know You Know" (Bernard Edwards, Nile Rodgers) – 5:39
 "Under Arrest" (Bernard Edwards, Deborah Harry, Nile Rodgers, Chris Stein) – 3:03
 "Military Rap" (Deborah Harry, Chris Stein) – 3:51
 "Oasis" (Bernard Edwards, Deborah Harry, Nile Rodgers, Chris Stein) – 4:59

Bonus Tracks CD Re-Issue UK 1994
 "Backfired" 12" Mix – 6:23
 "The Jam Was Moving" 12" Mix – 5:03

Bonus Track CD Re-Issue US 1999
 "Backfired" 12" Mix – 6:23

Bonus Tracks CD Re-Issue 2011
 "Backfired" 12" Mix – 6:23
 "The Jam Was Moving" 12" Mix – 5:03
 "Inner City Spillover" 12" Mix – 5:58

Personnel
 Debbie Harry – vocals
 Nile Rodgers – guitar, vocals on "Backfired"
 Bernard Edwards – bass guitar
 Tony Thompson – drums
 Robert Sabino – keyboards
 Raymond Jones – keyboards
 Nathaniel S. Hardy, Jr. – keyboards
 Chris Stein – guitar
 Vinnie Della Rocca – horns
 Ray Maldonado – horns
 Sammy Figueroa – percussion
 Manolo Badrena – percussion
 Roger Squitero – percussion
 Spud Devo – backing vocals
 Pud Devo – backing vocals
 Gordon Grody – backing vocals
 Fonzi Thornton – backing vocals
 "Chuck Martin" (Bill Scheniman) – dog bark

Production
 Nile Rodgers – producer for Chic Organization Ltd.
 Bernard Edwards – producer for Chic Organization Ltd.
 Bill Scheniman – sound engineer
 Jason Corsaro – second engineer
 H. R. Giger – cover concept and painting
 Brian Aris – photography
 Peter Wagg – art direction
 Dennis King – mastering at Atlantic Studios
 Recorded and mixed at The Power Station, NYC

Charts

Weekly charts

Year-end charts

Certifications

References

Further reading
 Cathay Che: Deborah Harry: Platinum Blonde André Deutsch Publications 1999, .
 Debbie Harry, Victor Bockris & Chris Stein: Making Tracks: The Rise of Blondie Horizon Book Promotions 1982, .

1981 debut albums
Albums produced by Bernard Edwards
Albums produced by Nile Rodgers
Albums with cover art by H. R. Giger
Chrysalis Records albums
Debbie Harry albums